Berners-Lee may refer to:

 Conway Berners-Lee (1921–2019), British mathematician and computer scientist, father of Mike and Tim Berners-Lee
 Mike Berners-Lee (born 1964), English researcher and writer on greenhouse gases
 Tim Berners-Lee (born 1955), British engineer and computer scientist, known for his creation of the World Wide Web

See also 
 13926 Berners-Lee, main-belt asteroid

Compound surnames